Flottille 17F is a squadron of French Naval Aviation which currently flies the Dassault Rafale M from Landivisiau Naval Air Base. It was formed during April 1958 at Hyeres Naval Air Base and flew the Vought F4U7 Corsair for training purposes.

Flottille 17F is nicknamed "La glorieuse". The symbol of the 17F flotilla is the osprey.

History

It quickly proved itself in the Algerian theater of operations and Tunisia.

The squadron was dissolved in 1962, but later reformed on 10 January 1964 using the Dassault Etendard IV M with the Super Etendard entering service on 5 September 1980, 17F was the first flotilla to use the Super Étendard Modernisé.

The Super Etendard aircraft composing the Flottille 17F regularly embarked aboard the French nuclear aircraft-carrier Charles de Gaulle.

Flottille 17F was involved in many conflicts such as:
 Mission Olifant in 1983 in Lebanon;
 Mission Prometheus for 14 months in the Gulf of Oman;
 Mission Capselle off the coast of Lebanon in August 1989;
 Opération Daguet during the Gulf War.
 Former Yugoslavia aboard Clemenceau and Foch between 1993 and 1996
 Afghanistan (Mission Héraclès, Operation Agapanthe, Operation Anaconda) aboard Charles de Gaulle from 2001 from the Indian Ocean
 Libya (Opération Harmattan) aboard Charles de Gaulle during 2011.

Flotilla 17F was the last French unit to use the Super Etendard Modernisé aircraft which was retired on 12 July 2016.

Present day

The unit currently flies the Dassault Rafale M F3-R.

References

External links

Naval aviation units and formations
Squadrons by navy
French Naval Aviation squadrons